The Hammick Baronetcy, of Cavendish Square, London, is a title in the Baronetage of the United Kingdom. It was created on 25 July 1834 for the noted surgeon and physician Stephen Hammick.

Hammick baronets, of Cavendish Square (1834)
Sir Stephen Love Hammick, 1st Baronet (1777–1867)
Sir St Vincent Love Hammick, 2nd Baronet (1806–1888)
Sir St Vincent Alexander Hammick, 3rd Baronet (1839–1927)
Captain Stephen Frederick Hammick (1879–1916), killed in action during World War I, and only son of the 3rd Baronet.
Vice-Admiral Robert Frederick Hammick (1843–1922), 2nd son of the 2nd Baronet and father of the 4th Baronet.
Sir George Frederick Hammick, 4th Baronet (1885–1964)
Sir Stephen George Hammick, 5th Baronet (1926–2014)
Sir Jeremy Charles Hammick, 6th Baronet (born 1956)

Extended family
Sir Murray Hammick, seventh son of the second Baronet, was in the Indian Civil Service. Alexander Hammick (1887–1969), younger brother of the fourth Baronet, was a rear admiral in the Royal Navy.

Notes

Hammick